DFG / LFA Buc is a German-French international lycée/gymnasium located in Buc, Yvelines, France, in the Paris metropolitan area.

The LFA Buc is a UNESCO Associated School.

Notable alums
 Fleur Pellerin, former culture minister of France

See also
 List including the French international schools in Germany
 Section Internationale Anglophone de Buc

References

External links

 DFG / LFA Buc

German international schools in France
France–Germany relations
Lycées in Yvelines
1975 establishments in France
Educational institutions established in 1975